Saint Herodian or Heron (died 136 AD) was a 2nd-century Christian martyr and Bishop of Antioch, successor of Ignatius at Antioch, a title he held for two decades.

References

136 deaths
Saints from Roman Syria
2nd-century Christian martyrs
Year of birth unknown